Cattania is a genus of gastropods belonging to the family Helicidae.

The species of this genus are found in Southeastern Europe.

Species:

Cattania apfelbecki 
Cattania ardica 
Cattania balcanica 
Cattania faueri 
Cattania haberhaueri 
Cattania ista 
Cattania kattingeri 
Cattania maranajensis 
Cattania olympica 
Cattania pelia 
Cattania petrovici 
Cattania polinskii 
Cattania pseudocingulata 
Cattania rumelica 
Cattania subaii 
Cattania sztolcmani 
Cattania thateensis 
Cattania trizona 
Cattania zebiana

References

Helicidae